Bohlinger is a surname. Notable people with the surname include:

John Bohlinger (born 1936), American businessman and politician
John Bohlinger (born  1967), American musician and writer 
Rob Bohlinger (born 1975), American football player

See also
Bollinger (surname)